James and Lois Richmond Center for Visual Arts is a visual arts center at Western Michigan University in Kalamazoo, Michigan, United States. It was opened on March 9, 2007 and was dedicated on Thursday, April 12, 2007. Along with Kohrman Hall Studios, the Richmond Center for VIsual Arts houses the Gwen Frostic School of Art.

The Richmond Center for Visual Arts is made up of three galleries on the first floor. These galleries are the Albertine Monroe-Brown Gallery for rotating exhibitions, the Netzorg/Kerr Gallery for special exhibits and showings from the University Art Collection, and the Eleanor R. and Robert A. DeVries Student Art Gallery for student and alumni exhibitions. The Richmond Center for Visual Arts also includes two lecture halls, administration and advising offices, the WMU Design Center, a graphic design classroom and studio space, a small computer lab and a print center.

External links
 Official Gwen Frostic School of Art web site

Western Michigan University
Buildings and structures in Kalamazoo, Michigan
Arts centers in Michigan
Tourist attractions in Kalamazoo, Michigan
Event venues established in 2007
Art galleries established in 2007
2007 establishments in Michigan